Prys-Iorwerth is an area in the  community of Llangristiolus, Ynys Môn, Wales, which is 131 miles (210.9 km) from Cardiff and 215.3 miles (346.4 km) from London.

References

See also
List of localities in Wales by population

Villages in Anglesey